David Vidal Tomé (born 2 August 1950) is a Spanish football manager and former player who played as a centre-back.

Football career
Vidal was born in Porto do Son, A Coruña, Galicia. After an unassuming career (the central defender never played in La Liga and appeared in only 15 Segunda División games) he took up coaching in 1982, first with Cádiz CF in his adopted city.

Vidal began with the Andalusians' youth sides, then moved to assistant manager, being finally appointed head coach for the 1988–89 season after a brief interim spell in 1987. It was during that time he managed arguably the club's best ever player, Mágico González, of whom he once said: "Technically he was better than Maradona".

After two and a half additional years in the top flight with modest CD Logroñés, who always retained their status, Vidal resumed his career mainly in the second tier. On 12 January 2007, he was appointed manager of Elche CF following the sacking of Luis García. On 12 October of the following year, as a draw at RC Celta de Vigo meant Elche only managed two points from seven matches, the manager was dismissed after a meeting with the board of directors; his assistant, former Spain and Deportivo de La Coruña player Claudio Barragán was temporarily placed in charge of the team.

On 17 March 2010, Albacete Balompié announced that Vidal would replace Julián Rubio as manager until the end of the campaign. After helping the Castile-La Mancha side avoid relegation from division two, as 15th, he was released.

Vidal returned to Albacete midway through the 2010–11 season, replacing the fired Antonio Calderón. He was also relieved of his duties after only one and a half months in charge, as the team was eventually relegated to the Segunda División B after 21 years.

After two years out of football, Vidal was appointed at Tercera División club Xerez CD on 13 July 2013. As it was in the midst of severe economic problems, he left after less than one month, and continued to work in the lower leagues.

In May 2017, Vidal achieved promotion to the second division with Lorca FC after arriving the previous month. On 5 June, however, his contract was not extended.

On 20 June 2019, after nearly two years of inactivity, Vidal was appointed manager of Racing Murcia FC in the regional leagues. In October 2020, he left due to personal reasons and was replaced by Antonio Pedreño.

Honours

Manager
Murcia
Segunda División: 2002–03

References

External links

1950 births
Living people
People from Noia (comarca)
Sportspeople from the Province of A Coruña
Spanish footballers
Footballers from Galicia (Spain)
Association football defenders
Segunda División players
Segunda División B players
Tercera División players
Deportivo Fabril players
UE Lleida players
Deportivo de La Coruña players
Cádiz CF players
Villarreal CF players
Xerez CD footballers
UD Melilla footballers
CD Logroñés footballers
Jerez Industrial CF players
Spanish football managers
La Liga managers
Segunda División managers
Segunda División B managers
Tercera División managers
Cádiz CF managers
CD Logroñés managers
Rayo Vallecano managers
Villarreal CF managers
Hércules CF managers
SD Compostela managers
Real Murcia managers
UD Las Palmas managers
UE Lleida managers
Elche CF managers
Albacete Balompié managers
Xerez CD managers
CD Guadalajara (Spain) managers
Lorca FC managers